Willisburg Lake is a  reservoir in Washington County, Kentucky. It was created in 1969.
Access Off Hwy. KY 555 At Boat Docks

References

External links 
 

Infrastructure completed in 1969
Reservoirs in Kentucky
Protected areas of Washington County, Kentucky
Bodies of water of Washington County, Kentucky